Raghupati Sahay (28 August 1896 – 3 March 1982), also known by his pen name Firaq Gorakhpuri, was an Indian writer, critic, and, according to one commentator, one of the most noted contemporary Urdu poets from India.  He established himself among peers including Muhammad Iqbal, Yagana Changezi, Jigar Moradabadi and Josh Malihabadi.

Early life and career
Raghupati Sahay was born in Banwarpar village of Gorakhpur district on 28 August 1896 in a well-to-do and educated family. He finished his basic education and then completed his Master's degree in Urdu, Persian and English literature.

Firaq had shown early signs of excellence in Urdu poetry and had  always shown attraction towards literature. His contemporaries included famous Urdu poets like Allama Iqbal, Faiz Ahmed Faiz, Kaifi Azmi and Sahir Ludhianvi. Yet he was able to make his mark in Urdu poetry at an early age.

He was selected for the Provincial Civil Service (P.C.S.) and the Indian Civil Service (British India) (I.C.S.), but he resigned to follow Mahatma Gandhi's Non-cooperation movement, for which he went to jail for 18 months. Later, he joined Allahabad University as a lecturer in English literature. It was there that he wrote most of his Urdu poetry, including his magnum opus Gul-e-Naghma which earned him the highest literary award of India, the Jnanpith Award, and also the 1960 Sahitya Akademi Award in Urdu. During his life, he was given the positions of Research Professor at the University Grants Commission and Producer Emeritus by All India Radio. After a long illness, he died on 3 March 1982, in New Delhi.

Gorakhpuri was well-versed in all traditional metrical forms such as ghazal, nazm, rubaai and qat'aa. He wrote more than a dozen volumes of Urdu poetry, a half dozen of Urdu prose, several volumes on literary themes in Hindi, as well as four volumes of English prose on literary and cultural subjects.

His biography, Firaq Gorakhpuri: The Poet of Pain & Ecstasy, written by his nephew Ajai Mansingh was published by Roli Books in 2015. The book included anecdotes from his life and translations of some of his work.

Selected works
Gul-e-Naghma  گلِ نغمہ 
Gul-e-Ra'naa گلِ رعنا
Mash'aal مشعال
Rooh-e-Kaayenaat  روحِ کائنات
Roop رُوپ (Rubaayi رُباعی ) 
Shabnamistaan شبنمِستان
Sargam سرگم
Bazm-e-Zindagi Rang-e-Shayri بزمِ زندگی رنگِ شاعری

Awards
1960 – Sahitya Akademi Award in Urdu
1968 – Padma Bhushan
1968 – Soviet Land Nehru Award
1969 – Jnanpith Award (First Jnanpith Award for Urdu literature)
1970 – Sahitya Akademi Fellowship
1981 – Ghalib Academy Award

Death and legacy
Firaq Gorakhpuri died on 3 March 1982 at age 85. Firaq fought for secularism all his life and played a key role against the then government's effort to label Urdu as a language of the Muslims.

References

External links
 Best of Firaq Gorakhpuri's ghazals

1896 births
1982 deaths
Indian male poets
Urdu-language poets from India
Hindu poets
People from Gorakhpur
University of Allahabad alumni
Academic staff of the University of Allahabad
Recipients of the Sahitya Akademi Award in Urdu
Recipients of the Sahitya Akademi Fellowship
Recipients of the Jnanpith Award
Poets from Uttar Pradesh
20th-century Indian poets
Recipients of the Padma Bhushan in literature & education
20th-century Indian male writers